Hope's Anthem is the debut studio album by William Matthews. Bethel Music alongside Kingsway Music released the album on July 26, 2011.

Critical reception

Rating the album an eight out of ten from Cross Rhythms, Tony Cummings writes about the purpose of the album as "A worthy aim indeed." Kelly Sheads, awarding the album three and a half stars at New Release Tuesday, states, "While this album doesn’t necessarily bring anything new to the table lyrically", yet "The sound on this album is more unique and soulful than your average worship CD".

Track listing

Charts

References

2011 albums
William Matthews (musician) albums